The 1987 South Pacific Games was the eighth edition where football was introduced and was held in New Caledonia during December 1987.

Group stage

Bronze medal match

Gold medal match

External links
Details on RSSSF website

1987
Football at the Pacific Games
Pac
P
1987 Pacific Games